In Egyptian mythology, Am-heh was a minor god from the underworld, whose name means either "devourer of millions" or "eater of eternity". He was depicted as a man with the head of a hunting dog who lived in a lake of fire. He is sometimes seen as an aspect of Ammit, the personification of divine retribution. Am-heh could only be repelled by the god Atum.

References

Egyptian gods
Underworld gods
Egyptian underworld
Animal gods
Mythological dogs

ca:Am-heh